The third season of Malcolm in the Middle premiered on November 11, 2001, on Fox, and ended on May 12, 2002, with a total of 22 episodes. Frankie Muniz stars as the title character Malcolm, and he is joined by Jane Kaczmarek, Bryan Cranston, Christopher Kennedy Masterson, Justin Berfield and Erik Per Sullivan.

Episodes

Cast and characters

Main 
 Frankie Muniz as Malcolm
 Jane Kaczmarek as Lois
 Bryan Cranston as Hal
 Christopher Kennedy Masterson as Francis
 Justin Berfield as Reese
 Erik Per Sullivan as Dewey

Notable guests 
 Brenda Wehle as Lavernia
 Craig Lamar Traylor as Stevie Kenarban
 David Anthony Higgins as Craig Feldspar
 Daniel von Bargen as Edwin Spangler
 Eric Nenninger as Eric Hanson
 Evan Matthew Cohen as Lloyd
 Kyle Sullivan as Dabney
 Merrin Dungey as Kitty Kenarban
 Tania Raymonde as Cynthia Sanders
 Susan Sarandon as Meg 
 Bradley Whitford as Meg's husband

Production 
Main cast members Frankie Muniz, Jane Kaczmarek, Bryan Cranston, Christopher Kennedy Masterson, Justin Berfield and Erik Per Sullivan return as Malcolm, Lois, Hal, Francis, Reese and Dewey respectively. The season introduces the recurring character Piama Tananahaakna, with Emy Coligado cast in the role. It is also the final one to feature Eric Hanson, played by Eric Nenninger. The season's parallel plot involving Francis shifts from Marlin Academy to a resort in Alaska. The episode "Clip Show", true to its title, serves as a clip show, incorporating footage from previous episodes presented as flashbacks.

Release

Broadcast history 
The season premiered on November 11, 2001 on Fox, and ended on May 12, 2002 with a total of 22 episodes.

Home media 
The season was released on Region 2 DVD on February 4, 2013, and on Region 4 DVD on September 4, 2013.

Reception 
Greg Braxton of Los Angeles Times lauded the season premiere for its comedy, particularly Cranston's performance. For her performance as Meg in the two-parter "Company Picnic", Susan Sarandon was nominated in the Outstanding Guest Actress in a Comedy Series category, but lost to Cloris Leachman.

In 2019, Angelo Delos Trinos of Screen Rant criticized the episode "Cynthia's Back" as being outdated. He said, "While not the worst of its kind, Cynthia's Back suffers from depicting outdated stereotypes about women being too emotional and casual sexual harassment."

References 

2001 American television seasons
2002 American television seasons
Malcolm in the Middle